First opened in 1977, the crescent-shaped Mount Lofty Botanic Garden is situated on 100 hectares on the eastern slopes of Mount Lofty in the Adelaide Hills east of Adelaide in South Australia. The cooler, wetter location suits plants from temperate climates which are difficult to grow on the Adelaide Plains. Amongst the native Australian flora there are tree ferns, as well as exotic cultivated plants from cool climates including Rhododendron and Magnolia and the National Species Rose Collection.  The Mount Lofty Botanic Garden, together with the Adelaide and Wittunga Botanic Gardens, is administered by the Botanic Gardens of South Australia, a State Government statutory authority.

In 1980, it was listed on the now-defunct Register of the National Estate.

Gallery

See also
List of Adelaide parks and gardens

References

Further reading
Aitken, Richard (2006). Seeds of change : an illustrated history of Adelaide Botanic Garden. Adelaide : Board of the Botanic Gardens and State Herbarium.

External links
Mt Lofty Botanic Garden
Friends of the Botanic Gardens of Adelaide Retrieved 12 September 2012
Botanic Gardens of South Australia Retrieved 29 June 2017.

Parks in Adelaide
Tourist attractions in Adelaide
Botanical gardens in Australia
1977 establishments in Australia
Gardens in South Australia
South Australian places listed on the defunct Register of the National Estate